Fu Yung Pei aka. Fu Yung Pit is a village in Sha Tin District, Hong Kong.

See also
 Kau Yeuk (Sha Tin)
 Gilwell Campsite
 Fu Yung Pit, a nearby hill with the same name as the alternate name of the village

External links

 Delineation of area of existing village Fu Yung Pei (Sha Tin) for election of resident representative (2019 to 2022)

Villages in Sha Tin District, Hong Kong